Mabeyn-i hümayun was the secretariat of the Ottoman sultan.

List of secretaries
 Ahmad Izzat Pasha al-Abid, Second Secretary of Abdulhamid II
 Mehmed Said Pasha
 Tahsin Pasha, First Secretary of Abdulhamid II

References

External links

Mabeyn-i hümayun